Monroe Street Bridge is bridge over the Passaic River in Passaic and Garfield, New Jersey. The 3-span reinforced concrete elliptical deck arch bridge was built in 1908. It was designed by Colin Wise and built by C.W. Dean and Company. It is 306 feet long and 30.2 feet wide.

See also
 List of crossings of the Lower Passaic River

References

Bridges over the Passaic River
Deck arch bridges in the United States
Bridges completed in 1908
Road bridges in New Jersey
Garfield, New Jersey
Buildings and structures in Passaic, New Jersey
Bridges in Bergen County, New Jersey
Bridges in Passaic County, New Jersey
Concrete bridges in the United States
1908 establishments in New Jersey